Acacia parvipinnula, commonly known as silver-stemmed wattle, is a species of Acacia native to eastern Australia.

Description
It has silvery to bluish grey smooth bark and angled to erect branchlets that have low ridges and are often covered in a fine white powder and are densely covered with minute hairs. Following flowering straight to curved seed pods form that are a little and usually irregularly more deeply constricted between seeds.

Distribution
It has a limited distribution in coastal areas of central New South Wales from around Singleton to around the Shoalhaven River where it is found in a variety of habitats growing in many different soil types as a part of dry sclerophyll forest or woodland communities.

Cultural significance
In the Dharawal story of the Boo’kerrikin Sisters, one of the kindly sisters was turned into Acacia parvipinnula.  The other two sisters were turned into Acacia decurrens and Acacia parramattensis.

See also
 List of Acacia species

References

parvipinnula
Fabales of Australia
Flora of New South Wales
Taxa named by Mary Tindale
Plants described in 1960